Room 8 is a short, six-minutes-long film that was one of several short films that won the Bombay Sapphire's Imagination Series. The film is based on a script by Oscar-winning screenwriter Geoffrey S. Fletcher. After Fletcher completed the dialogue, the script (without stage direction) was released and contestants would create their film using this dialogue. Room 8 was directed by James W. Griffiths, editing student of National Film and Television School. Griffiths won £40,000 from Bombay Sapphire to make the film. Although Room 8 takes place in London, it was filmed in Poland due to cost restraints. It premiered at the Tribeca Film Festival and later won the BAFTA Short Film Award in 2014. It was the first and only branded film to win the award.

References

British short films